Syfy was a Dutch-language pay television channel service specialising in science fiction, fantasy, and horror shows and movies. The channel launched in 2007 as a sister channel to the US Sci Fi Channel, with a similar programming line-up. Syfy operated as a channel service of Universal Networks International, a division of NBCUniversal.

Sci-Fi Channel had previously been available in Benelux in the 1990s. Failing to attract audiences, the channel withdrew from the Benelux and Scandinavia at the end of 1998, focusing on their UK service instead.

An HD-simulcast started through UPC Netherlands on 1 May 2013.

It officially ceased broadcasting on 1 July 2016.

Programming 

Angel
Battlestar Galactica
Dark Angel
Destination Truth
Doctor Who (Series 7)
Eureka
Firefly
Flash Gordon
Haven
Painkiller Jane
Paranormal Witness
Primeval
Primeval: New World
Raines
Roswell
Sanctuary
Sliders
Star Trek
Star Trek: Enterprise
Star Trek: The Next Generation
Stargate Atlantis
Stargate Universe
The X-Files
Tin Man
Torchwood
Tremors

References

External links 
 

Syfy
Science fiction television channels
Defunct television channels in the Netherlands
Defunct television channels in Belgium
Television channels and stations established in 2007
Television channels and stations disestablished in 2016